Novadrome is a vehicular combat game created by Stainless Games, which was released on December 20, 2006 for Xbox 360, through Xbox Live Arcade. It pits players against each other in an arena style deathmatch. The game features three singleplayer modes (career, arcade, and free play) and a multiplayer mode for up to 8 players via Xbox Live. Novadrome features 24 different vehicles, 15 different multiplayer maps.

Reception

The game fared poorly in the media, earning a GameRankings average of 52%.

References

External links
 Stainless Games Official Website

2006 video games
Multiplayer and single-player video games
Stainless Games games
Vehicular combat games
Video games developed in the United Kingdom
Xbox 360 games
Xbox 360 Live Arcade games
Xbox 360-only games